is a waterfall in Fujinomiya, Shizuoka Prefecture, near Mount Fuji, Japan. It is part of the Fuji-Hakone-Izu National Park. Another waterfall, the Shiraito Falls is about a five-minute walk away.

The name "Sound Stopping Waterfall" comes from an episode in the Soga Monogatari story of the Kamakura period. When the Soga brothers accompanied Minamoto no Yoritomo on a hunting expedition to the base of Mount Fuji, they plotted to assassinate one of Yoritomo's retainers, Kudō Tsuketsune, who was the murderer of their father. In order to avoid being overheard, they planned their strategy by the roaring waters of this waterfall.

The Otodome Falls is listed as one of the "Japan's Top 100 Waterfalls", in a listing published by the Japanese Ministry of the Environment in 1990.

References
Southerland, Mary and Britton, Dorothy. The National Parks of Japan. Kodansha International (1995).

External links
World of Waterfalls home page

Waterfalls of Japan
Landforms of Shizuoka Prefecture